Danukh is a rural locality (a selo) in Gumbetovsky District, Republic of Dagestan, Russia. The population was 812 as of 2010. There are 6 streets.

Geography 
Danukh is located 25 km northeast of Mekhelta (the district's administrative centre) by road. Gadari and Artlukh are the nearest rural localities.

References 

Rural localities in Gumbetovsky District